Danger Days: The True Lives of the Fabulous Killjoys (often referred to as simply Danger Days) is the fourth studio album by American rock band My Chemical Romance, released on November 22, 2010, by Reprise Records. Its songs are associated with the band's well known sound of alternative rock, pop-punk, and punk rock, but also introduces new musical elements, including power pop, pop rock, and electronic rock. The primary musical inspiration for the album came from contemporary rock, psychedelic rock, and protopunk bands of the sixties and seventies. It was the final album released by the band before their six-year disbandment from 2013 to 2019.

Like the band’s previous album The Black Parade, Danger Days is a rock opera. The album's storyline takes place in post-apocalyptic California in 2019, where a group of rebellious outsiders known as Killjoys battle against an evil corporation. In 2013, frontman Gerard Way published a comic that continues the story described in the album.

To promote the album, the band embarked on a world tour, titled The World Contamination Tour. It lasted from October 2010 to February 2012, and included concerts in Europe, North America, Asia and Oceania; the band also co-headlined the 10th Annual Honda Civic Tour with Blink-182. Danger Days received generally positive reviews from critics and sold 112,000 copies in its first week, debuting at the top of the Billboard Rock Albums and Alternative Albums charts, and at number 8 on the Billboard 200. It also appeared in the music charts in several other countries. By February 2011, Danger Days had sold over a million copies worldwide.

Background 
Following the grueling but highly successful tour for The Black Parade, My Chemical Romance entered the studio with producer Brendan O'Brien to produce the band's next album. The band, exhausted with the touring for The Black Parade and its dark tone, wanted to make a conscious break with the sound of that album, and take a more fun, stripped-down approach with "no concepts, no characters, no costumes, and no extra instrumentation". However, the band became unhappy with the final results of their recordings with O'Brien; while they felt as though they had achieved their goals, they also felt that they were holding themselves back creatively. As a result, My Chemical Romance decided to shelve the album, a move that the band's label, Reprise Records, was supportive of. The sessions with Brendan O'Brien were eventually released in 2012 under the name Conventional Weapons.

After shelving the record, the band returned back to the studio with The Black Parade producer Rob Cavallo, who helped reinvigorate and guide the band back on track. Three songs from the band's shelved album, "Bulletproof Heart", "The Only Hope For Me Is You" and "Party Poison" were brought back from the shelved album and re-recorded for the album.

Composition and lyrical themes
Danger Days is the band’s second rock opera, after  their previous album The Black Parade. The story is based around the fictional lives of the "Killjoys", a group of rebellious rogues living in a post-apocalyptic California in the year 2019. Occasionally narrated by pirate radio DJ Dr. Death Defying (voiced by Steve Montano), the album follows the group as they fight against the evil corporation Better Living Industries (BL/ind.) and its various "Draculoids" and exterminators, such as Korse (portrayed by Grant Morrison in music videos), from the S/C/A/R/E/C/R/O/W Unit.

In music videos and promotional material, the band members would portray their "Killjoy" alter-egos: "Party Poison" (Gerard Way), "Jet-Star" (Ray Toro), "Fun Ghoul" (Frank Iero), and "The Kobra Kid" (Mikey Way). The music video for "Na Na Na" shows the Killjoys' daily lives until Korse defeats them and captures "The Girl," while the video for "Sing" shows the Killjoys' rescue mission to get her back.

When asked about the album's title in a November 2010 interview, frontman Gerard Way said that "Danger Days is what it takes to do something great. It refers to us, to the fans, for all we know and artists who helped shape the album". Rolling Stone calls Danger Days a total rejection of the rock infladísimo celebrity. "Na Na Na" presents criticism of consumerist culture of the United States. The band described the main theme of "SING" as "subversion, and to delve under the skin of certain individuals politically, socially, and also to reach national television to talk about how we feel about the world." Toro calls "S/C/A/R/E/C/R/O/W" a psychedelic song that "shows the artistic side of the band," and was heavily inspired by songs like "Lucy in the Sky with Diamonds" by the Beatles. The final track, "Vampire Money," was a reaction to the band being asked to do a song for The Twilight Saga. Gerard Way said that the reason the song was on the album was because "there's a lot of people chasing that fucking money. Twilight?' A lot of people around us were like, 'Please, for the love of God, do this fucking movie.' But we'd moved on."

Promotion

The band posted a teaser trailer for the album on September 17, 2010, via their official YouTube account, titled "Art Is the Weapon". On September 19, 2010, the band announced "The World Contamination Tour", taking place in parts of the UK, France, Amsterdam and Germany. This was followed by US radio dates in December before moving onto Japan, a full Europe tour, a US tour, European festivals and the Honda Civic Tour with Blink-182 in 2011.

The album's first single "Na Na Na (Na Na Na Na Na Na Na Na Na)" premiered on air September 22, 2010 via WRFF in Philadelphia, BBC Radio 1, and KROQ-FM in Los Angeles. The track is featured in the film Movie 43, and is also featured in the video game The Sims 3: Late Night, sung in the fictional language of  Simlish. "The Only Hope for Me Is You" was released as a single on October 11, and was also given as a free download to anyone who pre-ordered the album on the iTunes Store. "SING" was covered on the Fox show Glee. "Planetary (Go!)" was featured in the video game Gran Turismo 5 and was also used in an advertisement for Super Bowl XLV. "The Kids From Yesterday" was premiered live on October 23, 2010. The songs "Na Na Na" and "Destroya" were also featured on the MTV show Teen Wolf.

Announced in an exclusive interview with Kerrang!, "Save Yourself, I'll Hold Them Back" was released as a free download on the band's official website on 5 November 2010. The album premiered on November 16, 2010, on the band's official website, hosted by Dr. Death Defying.

Critical reception

Upon its release, Danger Days: The True Lives of the Fabulous Killjoys received generally positive reviews. At Metacritic, which assigns a normalized rating out of 100 to reviews from mainstream critics, the album received an average score of 70, based on 26 reviews, which indicates "Generally favorable reviews".Rock Sound received a preview of the album, commenting "the way they've used everything they learned on The Black Parade and tightened up in certain places feels natural and confident" and that it sees "the creativity of the band taking flight musically, graphically and literally." Dan Martin of NME got the chance to preview the album and had equally positive reviews. He stated that "[t]his is the best rock record of the year by such a margin that you actually feel rather embarrassed for everybody else." Alternative Press reviewed the album, and commented, "It's truly hard to believe this is the same act who exploded onto the scene six years ago with the emo anthem, "I'm Not Okay (I Promise)"", as well as stating, "MCR have fully followed their own larger-than-life creative vision", with a rating of four stars. Matt Heafy, frontman and guitarist of the metal band Trivium, listed the album as the fourth best album of 2010. Stephen Thomas Erlewine of AllMusic awarded the album four and a half stars out of five and said the band were "Swapping gothic pomp for metallic power pop..." and that "there’s no emo bloodletting but for most listeners it’s crystallized fun, the purest rush My Chemical Romance has ever delivered."Rock Sound later reviewed the album, saying that "If MCR were your favourite band in the past it might feel like it’s going to take some steady reappraisal before you ink their new logo on your rough book" and that "Danger Days simply sounds like they’re having way more fun than ever." with a rating of eight stars out of ten.  It was number 28 on Rolling Stones list of the 30 Best Albums of 2010.

Editions

In addition to the standard CD edition, the band also offered the California 2019 Edition exclusively through its official online store. The edition features the standard CD version of the album as well as an exclusive EP, The Mad Gear and Missile Kid, a 48-page book titled Art Is the Weapon, a wooden "bad luck beads" bracelet, one of four polyresin prop ray-guns and a matching mask housed in a white box adorned with a photo sleeve. Because of manufacturing problems involving the craftsmanship of the 'ray-guns', the packages were shipped later in the year in February 2011.

An iTunes deluxe version was also released featuring the song "We Don't Need Another Song About California" and the music video for "Na Na Na".

On September 20, 2019, a Picture Disc Vinyl was released by Warner Music.

Comic series

In 2009, Way announced his intent to create a companion comic series titled The True Lives of the Fabulous Killjoys. He later announced at the 2012 New York Comic Con that he would co-write the series with Shaun Simon, the artwork would be done by Becky Cloonan, and that the first issue of the series would be released on June 6, 2013, with a preview of the book getting released on Free Comic Book Day. Way commented that the series would serve as the "last part of the story" and as a "coming to age story about a young girl".

Track listing

The Mad Gear and Missile KidThe Mad Gear and Missile Kid'' is an exclusive three-track EP by a fictional alter-ego band of the same name, and comes with the California 2019 special edition of the album. Guitarist Frank Iero told MTV "It's basically what the Killjoys are listening to in the car as they're having those gun battles".

Personnel
Credits adapted from the album's liner notes.My Chemical Romance Bob Bryar – songwriting (tracks 2, 3, 6, 8, and 9)
 Frank Iero – guitars, backing vocals, cover photograph for "Danger Days", production
 Ray Toro – guitars, backing vocals, production
 Gerard Way – lead and backing vocals, art direction, production
 Mikey Way – bass guitar, additional vocals (track 15), productionAdditional Dorian Crozier – drums (track 3)
 Airi Isoda as NewsAGoGo – additional vocals (track 8)
 John Miceli – drums, percussion
 Steven Montano (Steve, Righ?) as Dr. Death Defying – vocals (tracks 1, 2, 7, and 14)
 Jamie Muhoberac – keyboards, sound design
 Jonathan Rivera – additional vocals (track 12)Production'''
 Rob Cavallo – production
 Lars Fox – edition (additional protools)
 Dan Chase – edition (additional protools), additional sound engineer
 Doug McKean – sound engineer
 Russ Waugh – assistant sound engineer
 Steve Rea – assistant sound engineer
 Chris Lord-Alge – mixing
 Andrew Schubert – additional mixing
 Brad Townsend – additional mixing
 Keith Armstrong – additional mixing
 Nik Karpen – additional mixing
 Ted Jensen – mastering
 Neil Krug – photography
 Greg Watermann – additional photography
 Joe Libretti – drum technician
 Ace Bergman – guitar technician
 RJ Ronquillo – guitar technician
 Todd Youth – guitar technician
 Craig Aaronson – A&R
 Ellen Wakayama – art direction
 Matt Taylor – art direction, design
 3D Artist Management – management

Charts

Weekly charts

Year-end charts

Certifications

Release history

References

External links

 Danger Days: The True Lives of the Fabulous Killjoys at YouTube (streamed copy where licensed)
 

2010 albums
Albums produced by Rob Cavallo
Pop punk albums by American artists
Power pop albums by American artists
Alternative rock albums by American artists
Electronic rock albums by American artists
My Chemical Romance albums
Reprise Records albums
Science fiction concept albums
Fiction set in 2019